The Michigan State Spartans men's ice hockey statistical leaders are individual statistical leaders of the Michigan State Spartans men's ice hockey program in various categories, including goals, assists, points, and saves. Within those areas, the lists identify single-game, single-season, and career leaders. The Spartans represent Michigan State University in the NCAA's Big Ten Conference.

Michigan State began competing in intercollegiate ice hockey in 1921.  These lists are updated through the end of the 2020–21 season.

Goals

Assists

Points

Saves

References

Lists of college ice hockey statistical leaders by team
Statistical